Simon "Ghost" Riley is a fictional character in the Call of Duty story arc Modern Warfare. He first appears as a non-playable character in Call of Duty: Modern Warfare 2, where he is captain Soap MacTavish's second in command. He is known for his iconic skull-patterned balaclava, headset, and dark red sunglasses. His backstory is elaborated upon in the comic Modern Warfare 2: Ghost, which explored events leading up to him becoming a member of Task Force 141, and the short film Find Makarov: Operation Kingfish.

The reboot version of Riley was briefly mentioned in the 2019 title Call of Duty: Modern Warfare, being playable in its multiplayer and Call of Duty: Warzone. He made his campaign debut in the 2022 sequel, Call of Duty: Modern Warfare II. This version of Riley is depicted as having his entire face, save for his eyes, concealed by a skull-shaped mask.

An alternate version of Riley appears as a protagonist of Call of Duty: Mobile, and appears in Call of Duty: Infinite Warfare and Call of Duty: Ghosts as a skin in multiplayer. Riley is considered to be a breakout character for Modern Warfare 2, and is oftentimes cited as one of the most popular characters of the Call of Duty franchise.

Character design 
Riley is first introduced in the fifth mission of Modern Warfare 2, "Takedown." He is voiced by Craig Fairbrass. His backstory is explored in the comic book mini-series Modern Warfare 2: Ghost, where he is depicted as a survivor of domestic abuse from his father and struggling with complex psychological issues. His signature skull-patterned balaclava has been likened to similar usage of skull masks among real-world soldiers.

In Call of Duty: Modern Warfare II, Riley returns to the campaign, which takes place in a new timeline. He is voiced and portrayed via motion capture by actor Samuel Roukin, in spite of early reports suggesting that Fairbrass would return to voice the character. His character was intended by Infinity Ward to be explored and humanized in greater depth than the original. In the reboot, his past is kept a secret to preserve his anonymity and is described as being an "expert in clandestine tradecraft." He is known to prefer doing missions alone and suffers from trust issues.

Appearances

Original Modern Warfare sub-series

Call of Duty: Modern Warfare 2 
In Call of Duty: Modern Warfare 2, lieutenant Simon "Ghost" Riley is established to be a member of the SAS recruited by General Shepherd to serve in Task Force 141. He is sent on a mission in Rio de Janeiro to capture Alejandro Rojas, the supplier of terrorist Vladimir Makarov who caused a massacre of a Russian airport. He captures and prepares to torture Rojas' assistant, before narrowly escaping the favela amidst an incursion by a Brazilian militia. Using information extracted from Rojas, the group conducts a raid upon an oil rig leading to a "gulag" containing the prisoner Captain Price, with Riley hacking into the security system of the prison to help guide the team to Price. After discovering two possible locations for Makarov and his men, Riley and Gary "Roach" Sanderson raided a safe house in the Georgia-Russia border, finding crucial intelligence on the Ultranationalists. The two are then betrayed by General Shepherd upon their extraction, being fatally shot and their bodies incinerated, falling victim to Shepherd's plan to make himself a war hero by eliminating Makarov himself.

Rebooted Modern Warfare sub-series

Call of Duty: Modern Warfare and Warzone
In the ending scene of Call of Duty: Modern Warfare, Riley first appears as potential recruit for Task Force 141, along with MacTavish and Kyle "Gaz" Garrick.

Riley appears in the multiplayer modes, released with the Season Two Battle Pass. During the events of Warzone, Riley enters Verdansk to find Armistice members fighting against one another for survival against the toxic gas that was released into the city, and requests Price to send in backup. Months later, he groups up with the rest of Task Force 141, tracks down Viktor Zakhaev, and prevents him from launching a nuclear missile.

Call of Duty: Modern Warfare II 
In Call of Duty: Modern Warfare II, Riley is first seen under the command of General Shepherd, where assists Task Force 141 in the assassination of Iranian general Ghorbrani. He is then deployed to Mexico's border and the city of Las Almas, where he captures Quds Force Major Hassan Zyani, releasing him with a tracking device to prevent political fallout. Riley leads a raid on an abandoned oil rig to prevent a missile launch, but is then betrayed by Shadow Company commander Phillip Graves and General Shepherd, who take over the base and detain his men. Killing several members of the Shadow Company in pursuit, Riley manages to flee along with Soap, who he guides and bonds with as they escape Las Almas. The two men, alongside Rodolfo Parra, manage to break Alejandro and the rest of Los Vaqueros out of detainment while rendezvousing with Price and Gaz. In a warehouse owned by Alejandro, Riley unmasks himself and forms a "Ghost Team" with the 141 and Vaqueros to eliminate Graves before being alerted of a plot to fire a missile from Chicago into Washington D.C.. The team thwarts the plot and Riley kills Hassan just as he is about to throw Soap off of a building. Riley is last seen masked in a cafe where Price identifies the leader of the Russian Ultranationalists as Vladimir Makarov.

Other appearances 
Riley was featured as a playable character on the 2014 mobile game Call of Duty: Heroes.  The original Riley appears as a playable character in Call of Duty: Mobile and a protagonist of its comic book storyline, being added as a part of the Season 1 Battle Pass, while his reboot version appears as a costume.

Reception and legacy 
Simon "Ghost" Riley is considered to be one of the most iconic characters of the franchise. Ranking him as the best character of the series, Jorge Aguilar of Dot Esports describes him as "one of the best soldiers in the game" and that "his cool mask, sunglasses, and badass style caught fans’ attention." Riley's death in Modern Warfare 2 is often cited as an example of an impactful plot twist in gaming, with his betrayal at the hands of his own superior shocking players and solidifying Shepherd's role as the game's central antagonist. The reboot version of Riley has been praised for Roukin's portrayal, though the campaign of Modern Warfare II has been criticized for his increased characterization compared to the original.

His popularity has led to speculation of a spin-off game focused on his character, as well as being the namesake of Riley, a playable German Shepherd in Call of Duty: Ghosts. The presence of Riley, along with other male characters in fan fiction of the series has been the subject of scholarly attention. Riley's depiction in Modern Warfare II has led to him becoming the subject of homoerotic fan art and shipping with series protagonist Soap MacTavish. Critics noted his sex appeal and voice as having attracted users on TikTok to the game, considered to be outside the game's usual target demographic of heterosexual men. The trend has inspired commentary on the sexualization of men in video games.  Apart from that topic, a clip of Ghost uncannily staring at MacTavish has also became an internet meme which was then used with eerie music in the background for the purpose of humoristic short video edits and montages made by internet users.

Notes

References 

Activision characters
Call of Duty
Fictional British people in video games
Fictional lieutenants
Fictional people from Manchester
Fictional murdered people
Fictional Special Air Service personnel
Fictional soldiers in video games
Fictional victims of domestic abuse
Fictional War in Afghanistan (2001–2021) veterans
Fictional World War III veterans
Video game sidekicks
Male characters in video games
Video game characters introduced in 2009
Internet memes
Video game memes